The 2016 Oceania Sevens Championship was the ninth Oceania Sevens in men's rugby sevens. It was held at ANZ Stadium in Suva, Fiji. The host nation Fiji won the tournament, defeating Samoa 28–19 in the final. Papua New Guinea and Tonga, as the two highest finishers not already core teams in the Sevens World Series, won qualification to the 2017 Hong Kong Sevens for a chance to earn core team status for the 2018 season.

Teams
Participating nations for the 2016 tournament are:

Pool Stage

All times are Fiji Summer Time (UTC+13)

Pool A

Pool B

Knockout stage

9th-10th Place

5th-8th Place

Cup

Final standings

References

2016
2016 rugby sevens competitions
Sport in Suva
2016 in Oceanian rugby union
2016 in Fijian rugby union
International rugby union competitions hosted by Fiji
November 2016 sports events in Oceania